The Special Representative mechanism on the India-China boundary question (SR/SRM) was constituted in 2003 to "explore from the political perspective of the overall bilateral relationship the framework of a boundary settlement". Atal Bihari Vajpayee, in the capacity of Minister of External Affairs of India, had first suggested the SR mechanism during his visit to China in 1979. During another visit to China by Vajpayee, this time in the capacity of Prime Minister, in June 2003, the mechanism was mentioned in an agreement between the two countries. The latest mention of the SR mechanism was in a Joint Press Statement between India and China on 10 September 2020.

During the 4th round of talks in 2004, Dai Bingguo suggested that the SR mechanism follow a 3 step formula for the settlement of the India-China boundary question:

 Establish the political parameters and guiding principles
 Establish the framework for a final package settlement
 Delineate and demarcate the boundary

The first step was completed with the Agreement on the Political Parameters and Guiding Principles for the Settlement of the India-China Boundary Question being signed in 2005. The second phase of negotiations began with the sixth round of talks.

During the 15th round of the SR talks in 2012, the Working Mechanism for Consultation and Coordination was set up.

Rounds of talks 

 23–24 October 2003
 12–13 January 2004
 28 July 2004
 18–19 November 2004
 10–11 April 2005
 24–28 September 2005
 11–14 March 2006
 24–28 June 2006
 17–18 January 2007
 20–22 April 2007
 September 2007
 September 2008
 7–8 August 2009
 29–30 November 2010
 16–17 January 2012
 28–29 June 2013
 10-11 February 2014
 23 March 2015
 20 April 2016
 22 December 2017
 24 November 2018
 21 December 2019

List of Special Representatives

China

India

Commentary 
A Former Ambassador of India, Sourabh Kumar, questioned the three step approach, saying that it could be approached in a reverse manner.

Sinologist B. R. Deepak says that within three years, the SR mechanism, along with other CBMs, were redundant and consistently violated.

References 

Bibliography

 

China–India relations
China–India border